Fanny Cagnard (born 17 March 1981) is a French former competitive figure skater. She finished in the top ten at two World Junior Championships – 1997 and 1998 – and competed at three Champions Series events. After retiring from competition, she began coaching in Amiens.

 During her career , She also obtained 5 titles on French championships in Minime  / Espoir / Junior categories and 3 titles as Vice Champion in Minime / Cadette / Junior 

She competed for the French team from 1993 to 2000

Competitive highlights 
GP: Champions Series (Grand Prix)

References 

1981 births
French female single skaters
Living people
Sportspeople from Amiens